Everybody Dance may refer to:

Film and television
 Everybody Dance (film), a 1936 British film
 Everybody Dance! (TV series), a Ukrainian television program

Music
 Everybody Dance (album), a compilation album by Chic
 "Everybody Dance" (Chic song), a 1978 song by Chic
 "Everybody Dance" (Ta Mara and the Seen song)
 "Everybody Dance (The Horn Song)" by Barbara Tucker

Software
 Everybody Dance (video game), a 2011 PlayStation 3 video game